Pacific Fruit Express  was an American railroad refrigerator car leasing company that at one point was the largest refrigerator car operator in the world.

History
The company was founded on December 7, 1906, as a joint venture between the Union Pacific and Southern Pacific railroads. It began operation on October 1, 1907, with a fleet of 6,600 refrigerator cars built by the American Car and Foundry Company (ACF).

In 1923, the Western Pacific Railroad joined the venture by leasing its own new fleet of 2775 reefers to PFE.  They were painted in standard PFE colors with only WP heralds on the cars instead of the paired UP-SP markings.  The WP cars were all retired by the late 1950s, among the last wooden reefers in PFE's fleet.  WP ended its partnership with PFE in late 1967 and joined Fruit Growers Express instead.

PFE's assets were divided between the UP and SP when the company was split on April 1, 1978. It is now a UP subsidiary.

On September 1, 2022 Union Pacific closed the final Fruit Express shop in North Platte, Nebraska at Bailey Yard and all personal and equipment were transferred to the North Platte Service Unit Car Department. 

Pacific Fruit Express Roster, 1907–1970:

Source: The Great Yellow Fleet, p. 17.

Paint and markings
Modern cars owned by PFE typically carried both UP and SP heralds and either "Union Pacific Fruit Express" or "Southern Pacific Fruit Express".  The reporting marks were UPFE for cars operated by Union Pacific or SPFE for cars operated by Southern Pacific.

Legacy
PFE's impact is still seen in Roseville, California, site of a major Union Pacific classification yard, where there is a road named "PFE Road".

There are a pair of PFE tracks in the Union Pacific Albina Yard in Portland, Oregon

There is PFE track in Tucson Yard Tucson, Az.

PFE shops in Pocatello, Idaho are still used by the car department.

A PFE boxcar is on final display in Cody Park in North Platte, Nebraska behind Centennial 6922.

References

Further reading 
 Sacramento History Online (2004), Timeline - Transportation, Agriculture. Retrieved May 18, 2005 — company startup details.
 Thompson, Anthony W. et al. (1992). Pacific Fruit Express. Signature Press, Wilton, CA.  .
 White, John H. (1986). The Great Yellow Fleet. Golden West Books, San Marino, CA.  .

External links 
 Pacific Fruit Express Company #11207 — photo and short history of one of the last ice-type refrigerator cars built.
 Pacific Fruit Express Company #300010 — photo and short history of one of the first mechanical-type refrigerator cars built.
 Pacific Fruit Express photo gallery at the Union Pacific Railroad official website.

Railway companies established in 1906
Refrigerator car lines of the United States
Southern Pacific Railroad
Union Pacific Railroad
Western Pacific Railroad
American companies established in 1906